Kings & Queens is an album of early recordings by The Gits, recorded in 1988 and released in 1996 on Broken Rekids.  The album was originally self-released by the band in 1988 under the name Private Lubs  but did not receive an "official" release until 1996 when released under the Kings & Queens moniker. Several of the tracks that appear on this record were later re-recorded for The Gits debut album Frenching the Bully (1992).

Track listing
 "Eleven"  – 4:01  
 "Cut My Skin, It Makes Me Human"  – 2:31  
 "A"   – 1:34  
 "Running"   – 2:44  
 "Look Right Through Me"   – 1:51  
 "It All Dies Anyway"  – 4:27  
 "Monsters"  – 3:01  
 "It Doesn't Matter"  – 3:28  
 "Snivelling Little Rat Faced Git"   – 1:05  
 "Still You Don't Know What It's Like"   – 3:46  
 "Tempt Me"  – 2:17  
 "Gitsrumental"  – 1:45  
 "Kings and Queens"  – 2:15  
 "Ain't Got No Right"   – 2:38  
 "Loose"   – 2:23  
 "Graveyard Blues (Live)"   – 3:20

References 

The Gits albums
1996 albums